Kondikoppa  is a village in the southern state of Karnataka, India. It is located in the Navalgund taluk of Dharwad district.

Demographics 
As of the 2011 Census of India there were 368 households in Kondikoppa and a total population of 1,588 consisting of 788 males and 800 females. There were 170 children ages 0-6.

See also
 Dharwad
 Districts of Karnataka

References

External links
 http://Dharwad.nic.in/

Villages in Dharwad district